Johann Baptist Mayrhofer (22 October 17875 February 1836) was an Austrian poet and librettist. He is best known for his close friendship with the composer Franz Schubert.

Biography
Mayrhofer was born in Steyr, educated at Novitiate in St. Florian's Priory Upper Austria. In 1810 he began to study jurisprudence and theology at the University of Vienna, both of which courses he finished. He worked as a censor at the Zentral-Bücher-Revisions-Amt in Vienna. 

In 1814 he met the young composer Franz Schubert and his friends (Joseph von Spaun, Franz von Schober). 

From 1818-1821 he lived with Schubert in a one-room apartment in a house on Wipplingerstrasse 4.

After Schubert moved out, he wrote the poem An Franz for him:

Mayrhofer wrote a lot of lyric poetry and published it in 1824. Forty-seven Schubert songs and two of his operas (Die Freunde von Salamanka and Adrast) are based on texts by Mayrhofer.

In 1829 he published his Memories of Franz Schubert in the journal Neues Archiv für Geschichte, through which some remarkable information about Schubert and his circle of friends have been handed down.

Most scholars agree that he was homosexual, but some believe that as a young man Mayrhofer had been hopelessly in love with Mina (Wilhelmina Watteroth), the daughter of Heinrich Watteroth, who was one of Mayrhofer's professors and for a short time also his landlord. They also say that in his late years Mayrhofer fell in love with a young 15-year-old girl, the daughter of his landlord Doctor Strauss. 

Mayrhofer was a hypochondriac all his life: in 1836, during a cholera epidemic, he committed suicide by jumping from the window of his office in Vienna.

Libretti
 Die Freunde von Salamanca (1815)
 Adrast (1819)

References
 List, Fritz (1921), Johann Mayrhofer, ein Freund und Textdichter Franz Schuberts. Munich 1921. Print: Nittenau: Kangler: [1991]: 226 Bl.
 Rabenlechner, Michael Maria (1938),  Johann Mayrhofers Gedichte mit einem Lebensbild des Dichters. Wiener Bibliophilen-Gesellschaft 1938.
 Norman McKay, Elizabeth: Schubert and Classical Opera : The promise of Adrast. In: Erich Wolfgang Partsch (ed.): Der vergessene Schubert: Franz Schubert auf der Bühne. Böhlau, Wien 1997, p. 61–76.
 Ilija Dürhammer (1997), »Was ich gefühlt, hast Du gesungen« – Neue Dokumente zu Johann Mayrhofers Leben und Schaffen. In: Mitteilungen der österreichischen Gesellschaft für Musikwissenschaft 31 (März 1997), S.13-45.
 Ilija Dürhammer (1999), Schuberts literarische Heimat. Dichtung und Literatur-Rezeption der Schubert-Freunde. Wien-Köln-Weimar 1999.
 Michael Kohlhäufl (1999), Poetisches Vaterland. Dichtung und politisches Denken im Freundeskreis Franz Schuberts. Kassel 1999.
 Youens, Susan (1999), Schubert’s poets and the making of lieder. Cambridge Univ. Press 1999.
 Lorenz, Michael (2000), Dokumente zur Biographie Johann Mayrhofers. In: Schubert durch die Brille 25, June 2000, 21-50.
 Steblin, Rita (2001), "Schubert’s Problematic Relationship with Johann Mayrhofer: New Documentary Evidence". Essays on Music and Culture in Honor of Herbert Kellman, 2001, 465–495.
 Davidson, Michael; Hillenaar, Henk (2008), Schubert and Mayrhofer. London 2008.

Works
 Edition 1824 
 Ernst von Feuchtersleben’s Edition 1843 
 Mayrhofer’s Schubert songs

References

External links 
 Mayrhofer, Johann in Constant von Wurzbach: Biographisches Lexikon des Kaiserthums Oesterreich.  Vol. 17. Verlag L. C. Zamarski, Vienna 1856–1891, 186-190
 

 
 

19th-century Austrian poets
Austrian male poets
Austrian opera librettists
Franz Schubert
1787 births
1836 deaths
1830s suicides
Suicides by jumping in Austria